William Griffiths (7 April 1912 – 14 April 1973) was a British Labour Party politician in the United Kingdom.

Born in Manchester, Griffiths became an ophthalmic optician, and a Fellow of the British Optical Association.  During World War II, he served with the Eighth Army.  He was Member of Parliament for Moss Side from 1945 until 1950 and for Manchester Exchange from 1950 until his death at a hospital in Roehampton on 14 April 1973, one week after his 61st birthday.

References

External links 
 

1912 births
1973 deaths
British Army personnel of World War II
British optometrists
Labour Party (UK) MPs for English constituencies
Members of the Parliament of the United Kingdom for constituencies in Lancashire
Politicians from Manchester
UK MPs 1945–1950
UK MPs 1950–1951
UK MPs 1951–1955
UK MPs 1955–1959
UK MPs 1959–1964
UK MPs 1964–1966
UK MPs 1966–1970
UK MPs 1970–1974